is a Latin expression meaning literally 'Shoemaker, not beyond the shoe', used to warn individuals not to pass judgment beyond their expertise. The expression led to the term ultracrepidarianism, which is the giving of opinions and advice on matters outside of one's knowledge.

Its origin is set down in Pliny the Elder's Naturalis Historia [35.85 (Loeb IX, 323–325)] where he records that a shoemaker had approached the painter Apelles of Kos to point out a defect in the artist's rendition of a sandal ( from Greek ), which Apelles duly corrected. Encouraged by this, the shoemaker then began to enlarge on other defects he considered present in the painting, at which point Apelles advised him that  ('a shoemaker should not judge beyond the shoe'), which advice, Pliny observed, had become a proverbial saying. The Renaissance interest both in painting and classical antiquity made the expression popular again.

The saying remains popular in several languages, as in the English "A cobbler should stick to his last", the Dutch , the Danish , the German , and the Polish . Other languages use slightly changed forms: the Spanish  ('Shoemaker, [tend] to your shoes'), and the Russian  ('Judge not, pal, above the boot'), after Alexander Pushkin's poetic retelling of the legend.

Karl Marx ridiculed the idea: Ne sutor ultra crepidam' – this nec plus ultra of handicraft wisdom became sheer nonsense, from the moment the watchmaker Watt invented the steam-engine, the barber
Arkwright the throstle, and the working-jeweller Fulton the steamship."

Ultracrepidarianism 
Ultracrepidarianism is the behavior of giving of opinions and advice on matters outside of one's knowledge

The term ultracrepidarian was first publicly recorded in 1819 by the English essayist William Hazlitt in an open Letter to William Gifford, the editor of the Quarterly Review: "You have been well called an Ultra-Crepidarian critic." It was used again four years later in 1823, in the satire by Hazlitt's friend Leigh Hunt, Ultra-Crepidarius: A Satire on William Gifford. Occasionally the word ultracrepidarianism was used later.

See also 

 List of Latin phrases
 Dunning–Kruger effect
 Credentialism
 Domain knowledge
 Metallic Metals Act
 Nobel disease
 Subject-matter expert

References

External links 
 Ultracrepidrianism on World Wide Words

Latin literary phrases
Latin words and phrases